Kuiu is an American hunting gear and apparel brand using direct-to-consumer method. 

It was founded by Jason Hairston in 2011.

In 2017, San Francisco-based Main Post Partners invested $50 million in the company.

References

American brands
Clothing companies established in 2011
2011 establishments in the United States
Outdoor clothing brands